Yashodhara Air is an upcoming Nepalese airline set up by Buddha Air aimed at serving STOL-services to remote airfields in Nepal from two bases, Ramechhap Airport and Pokhara Airport.

History
In 2020, Buddha Air announced first plans to enter the rural aviation market in Nepal by serving smaller STOL-airfields by Fall 2021. Consequently, Yashodhara Air was set up in January 2021 with the aim of operating by 2022. In November 2021, during Dubai Airshow 2021 the airline the airline announced plans to launch in early 2023.

The airline's name derives from Yashodhara, the wife of Gautama Buddha after which the parent company Buddha Air is named.

Destinations
The airline is supposed to operate to remote airfields from two bases at Ramechhap Airport and Pokhara Airport.

Fleet
The airline is mulling over using different aircraft types including Viking Air DHC-6 Twin Otter, Let L-410 and Cessna 408. In November 2021, during Dubai Airshow 2021 the airline decided to purchase four Viking Air Twin Otters.

References

External links 

Airlines of Nepal
Airlines established in 2020
2020 establishments in Nepal
Airlines banned in the European Union